Erasmus+ is the European Commission's Programme for education, training, youth, and sport for the period 2021-2027, succeeding the previous programme (2007-2014). As an integrated programme, Erasmus+ offers more opportunities for the mobility of learners and staff and cooperation across the education, training, and youth sectors and is easier to access than its predecessors, with simplified funding rules and a structure that aims to streamline the administration of the programme. The new Erasmus+ Program, running from 2021–27, is more digital, inclusive and innovative, as well as greener.

Introduction
The new, larger program for the period 2021-2027 focuses on inclusion. The Programme is open to students, apprentices, teachers, lecturers, young people, volunteers, youth workers, and people working in grassroots sport. Approximately two-thirds of the budget is allocated to learning opportunities abroad for individuals, within the EU and beyond; the remainder will support partnerships between educational institutions, youth organizations, businesses, local and regional authorities and NGOs, as well as reforms to modernize education, training and youth systems.

Hard beginning
Erasmus+ has had a difficult start in 2021. This was due to the long negotiations on the EU budget, which still delayed the first calls. The number of exchange students has risen again to the level of the beginning of 2019.

Due to lengthy negotiations, Erasmus+ allocated 705 million euros in 2019, compared to 930 million euros in 2020. However, after the pandemic, the loyalty of teachers and students to distance learning has increased, and the budget for the second year has been increased to 997 million euros.

Erasmus+ for Education Staff 
Erasmus+ Key Action 1 (KA1) provides a unique opportunity for teachers, headmasters, trainers, and other staff of educational institutions to participate in international training courses in different European countries.

Schools, universities, vocational education and training, and adult education organizations are all eligible to receive full funding to attend courses under a KA1 mobility grant.

The Erasmus+ KA1 grant covers all the costs to attend teacher training courses: including travel, subsistence, and course fee.

In the new Erasmus+ programme (2021-2027) has been introduced the possibility of Erasmus accreditation for Key Action 1, which means that a school needs to be accredited only once during the seven years of the Programme (2021-2027).

Erasmus+ Key Action 2 (KA2) is dedicated to the creation of "strategic partnerships", international networks that apply under the guidance of a school in charge of coordinating the partnership. These projects are geared towards one of the following goals: Cooperation and exchange of good practices, Innovation, Research projects.

Erasmus+ Key Action 3 (KA3) is dedicated to centralized activities, usually managed by the Executive Agency (EACEA).

Jean Monnet Chairs
As part of the Jean Monnet Programme, there are Chairs as teaching posts with a specialization in European Union studies for university professors or senior lecturers.
Jean Monnet Chairs can:
 enhance the teaching of EU studies at your institution through the curriculum
 conduct, monitor, and supervise research on EU matters at all education levels
 be a mentor and advisor to the next generation of teachers and researchers
 provide expert guidance to future professionals about European matters
Jean Monnet Chairs are encouraged to:
 publish books within their university press during the grant period. The grant will cover part of the publication and, if need be, part of the translation costs
 participate in dissemination and information events in your country and around Europe
 organize events (lectures, seminars, workshops, etc.) with policymakers, civil society, and schools
 network with other academics and institutions supported by Jean Monnet
 apply open educational resources, and publish the summaries, content, schedule, and expected outcomes of your activities

See also
 Erasmus Programme
 Erasmus Mundus
 TEMPUS

References

External links
 Erasmus+ Programme website
Erasmus+ Programme Guide

Erasmus Programme
European Commission projects
European Union youth policy